Smardzewo  is a village in the administrative district of Gmina Szczaniec, within Świebodzin County, Lubusz Voivodeship, in western Poland.

The village has a population of 604.

Notable residents
 Heinz Nowotnik (1920-1999), SS officer

References

Smardzewo